Eucereon davidi is a moth of the subfamily Arctiinae. It was described by Paul Dognin in 1889. It is found in Ecuador, Bolivia, Colombia and Peru.

References

 Natural History Museum Lepidoptera generic names catalog

davidi
Moths described in 1889